Bathycadulus is a genus of molluscs belonging to the family Gadilidae.

The species of this genus are found in Europe, Southern Africa and Australia.

Species:

Bathycadulus fabrizioi 
Bathycadulus hendersoni 
Bathycadulus queirosi 
Bathycadulus segonzaci

References

Molluscs